Eupithecia semivacua is a moth in the family Geometridae. It is found in Peru.

References

Moths described in 1908
semivacua
Moths of South America